Necrobiosis is the physiological death of a cell, and can be caused by conditions such as basophilia, erythema, or a tumor.  It is identified both with and without necrosis.

Necrobiotic disorders are characterized by presence of necrobiotic granuloma on histopathology. Necrobiotic granuloma is described as aggregation of histiocytes around a central area of altered collagen and elastic fibers. Such a granuloma is typically arranged in a palisaded pattern.

It is associated with necrobiosis lipoidica and granuloma annulare.

Necrobiosis differs from apoptosis, which kills a damaged cell to protect the body from harm.

References

External links 

Cellular processes